The Pleiades, also known as The Seven Sisters, Messier 45 and other names by different cultures, is an asterism and an open star cluster containing middle-aged, hot B-type stars in the north-west of the constellation Taurus. At a distance of about 444 light years, it is among the nearest star clusters to Earth. It is the nearest Messier object to Earth, and is the most obvious cluster to the naked eye in the night sky. It is also observed to house the reflection nebula NGC 1432, an HII region. 

The cluster is dominated by hot blue luminous stars that have formed within the last 100 million years. Reflection nebulae around the brightest stars were once thought to be left over material from their formation, but are now considered likely to be an unrelated dust cloud in the interstellar medium through which the stars are currently passing. This dust cloud is estimated to be moving at a speed of approximately 18 km/s relative to the stars in the cluster.

Computer simulations have shown that the Pleiades were probably formed from a compact configuration that resembled the Orion Nebula. Astronomers estimate that the cluster will survive for about another 250 million years, after which it will disperse due to gravitational interactions with its galactic neighborhood.

Together with the open star cluster of the Hyades, the Pleiades form the Golden Gate of the Ecliptic.

Origin of name
It probably derives from plein ("to sail") because of the cluster's importance in delimiting the sailing season in the Mediterranean Sea: "the season of navigation began with their heliacal rising". However, in mythology the name was used for the Pleiades, seven divine sisters, the name supposedly deriving from that of their mother Pleione and effectively meaning "daughters of Pleione". In reality, the name of the star cluster almost certainly came first, and Pleione was invented to explain it.

Folklore and mythology

The Pleiades are a prominent sight in winter in the Northern Hemisphere, and are easily visible from mid-Southern latitudes. They have been known since antiquity to cultures all around the world, including the Celts, Hawaiians (who call them Makaliʻi), Māori (who call them Matariki), Indigenous Australians (from several traditions), the Achaemenid Empire, whence in Farsi (who called them پروین Parvīn or پروی Parvī), the Arabs (who call them الثريا al-Thurayya), the Chinese (who called them  mǎo), the Quechua (who call them Qullqa or the storehouse), the Japanese (who call them ), the Maya, the Aztec, the Sioux, the Kiowa, and the Cherokee. In Hinduism, the Pleiades are known as Kṛttikā and are scripturally associated with the war-god Kartikeya but the Hindus celebrate the first day (new moon) of the month of Kartik as Diwali, a festival of abundance and lamps. They are also mentioned three times in the Bible.

The earliest-known depiction of the Pleiades is likely a Northern German Bronze Age artifact known as the Nebra sky disk, dated to approximately 1600 BC. The Babylonian star catalogues name the Pleiades , meaning "stars" (literally "star star"), and they head the list of stars along the ecliptic, reflecting the fact that they were close to the point of vernal equinox around the 23rd century BC. The Ancient Egyptians may have used the names "Followers" and "Ennead" in the prognosis texts of the Calendar of Lucky and Unlucky Days of papyrus Cairo 86637. Some Greek astronomers considered them to be a distinct constellation, and they are mentioned by Hesiod's Works and Days, Homer's Iliad and Odyssey, and the Geoponica. The Pleiades was the most well-known star among pre-Islamic Arabs and so often simply referred to as "the Star" (al Najm). Some scholars of Islam suggested that the Pleiades (ath-thurayya) are the "star" mentioned in Surah An-Najm ("The Star") in the Quran.

Subaru 
In Japan, the cluster is mentioned under the name Mutsuraboshi ("six stars") in the 8th-century Kojiki. The cluster is now known in Japan as Subaru.

It was chosen as the name of the Subaru Telescope which is the  flagship telescope of the National Astronomical Observatory of Japan. It is located at the Mauna Kea Observatory on the island of Hawaii. It had the largest monolithic primary mirror in the world from its commissioning in 1998 until 2005.

It was chosen as the brand name of Subaru automobiles to reflect the origins of the firm as the joining of five companies, and is depicted in the firm's six-star logo.

Observational history
Galileo Galilei was the first astronomer to view the Pleiades through a telescope. He thereby discovered that the cluster contains many stars too dim to be seen with the naked eye. He published his observations, including a sketch of the Pleiades showing 36 stars, in his treatise Sidereus Nuncius in March 1610.

The Pleiades have long been known to be a physically related group of stars rather than any chance alignment. John Michell calculated in 1767 that the probability of a chance alignment of so many bright stars was only 1 in 500,000, and so surmised that the Pleiades and many other clusters of stars must be physically related. When studies were first made of the stars' proper motions, it was found that they are all moving in the same direction across the sky, at the same rate, further demonstrating that they were related.

Charles Messier measured the position of the cluster and included it as M45 in his catalogue of comet-like objects, published in 1771. Along with the Orion Nebula and the Praesepe cluster, Messier's inclusion of the Pleiades has been noted as curious, as most of Messier's objects were much fainter and more easily confused with comets—something that seems scarcely possible for the Pleiades. One possibility is that Messier simply wanted to have a larger catalogue than his scientific rival Lacaille, whose 1755 catalogue contained 42 objects, and so he added some bright, well-known objects to boost his list.

Edme-Sébastien Jeaurat then drew in 1782 a map of 64 stars of the Pleiades from his observations in 1779, which he published in 1786.

Distance

The distance to the Pleiades can be used as a key first step to calibrate the cosmic distance ladder. As the cluster is relatively close to the Earth, its distance should be relatively easy to measure and has been estimated by many methods. Accurate knowledge of the distance allows astronomers to plot a Hertzsprung–Russell diagram for the cluster, which, when compared to those plotted for clusters whose distance is not known, allows their distances to be estimated. Other methods can then extend the distance scale from open clusters to galaxies and clusters of galaxies, and a cosmic distance ladder can be constructed. Ultimately astronomers' understanding of the age and future evolution of the universe is influenced by their knowledge of the distance to the Pleiades. Yet some authors argue that the controversy over the distance to the Pleiades discussed below is a red herring, since the cosmic distance ladder can (presently) rely on a suite of other nearby clusters where consensus exists regarding the distances as established by the Hipparcos satellite and independent means (e.g., the Hyades, Coma Berenices cluster, etc.).

Measurements of the distance have elicited much controversy. Results prior to the launch of the Hipparcos satellite generally found that the Pleiades were about 135 parsecs (pc) away from Earth. Data from Hipparcos yielded a surprising result, namely a distance of only 118 pc by measuring the parallax of stars in the cluster—a technique that should yield the most direct and accurate results. Later work consistently argued that the Hipparcos distance measurement for the Pleiades was erroneous. In particular, distances derived to the cluster via the Hubble Space Telescope and infrared color-magnitude diagram fitting (so-called "spectroscopic parallax") favor a distance between 135 and 140 pc; a dynamical distance from optical interferometric observations of the Pleiad double Atlas favors a distance of 133 to 137 pc. However, the author of the 2007–2009 catalog of revised Hipparcos parallaxes reasserted that the distance to the Pleiades is ~120 pc and challenged the dissenting evidence. In 2012, Francis and Anderson proposed that a systematic effect on Hipparcos parallax errors for stars in clusters biases calculation using the weighted mean and gave a Hipparcos parallax distance of 126 pc and photometric distance 132 pc based on stars in the AB Doradus, Tucana-Horologium, and Beta Pictoris moving groups, which are all similar in age and composition to the Pleiades. Those authors note that the difference between these results can be attributed to random error.
More recent results using very-long-baseline interferometry (VLBI) (August 2014) and preliminary solutions using Gaia Data Release 1 (September 2016) and Gaia Data Release 2 (August 2018), determine distances of 136.2 ± 1.2 pc, 134 ± 6 pc and 136.2 ± 5.0 pc, respectively. The Gaia Data Release 1 team was cautious about their result and the VLBI authors assert "that the Hipparcos-measured distance to the Pleiades cluster is in error".

For another distance debate see Polaris#Distance, also with a different measurement from Hipparcos, although this time it suggested a greater distance.

Composition

The cluster core radius is about 8 light-years and tidal radius is about 43 light-years. The cluster contains over 1,000 statistically confirmed members, a figure that excludes an unresolved likely further number of binary stars. Its light is dominated by young, hot blue stars, up to 14 of which can be seen with the naked eye depending on local observing conditions and visual acuity of the observer. The arrangement of the brightest stars is somewhat similar to Ursa Major and Ursa Minor. The total mass contained in the cluster is estimated to be about 800 solar masses and is dominated by fainter and redder stars. An estimate of the frequency of binary stars in the Pleiades is about 57%.

The cluster contains many brown dwarfs, which are objects with less than about 8% of the Sun's mass, not heavy enough for nuclear fusion reactions to start in their cores and become proper stars. They may constitute up to 25% of the total population of the cluster, although they contribute less than 2% of the total mass. Astronomers have made great efforts to find and analyse brown dwarfs in the Pleiades and other young clusters, because they are still relatively bright and observable, while brown dwarfs in older clusters have faded and are much more difficult to study.

Brightest stars
The nine brightest stars of the Pleiades are named for the Seven Sisters of Greek mythology: Sterope, Merope, Electra, Maia, Taygeta, Celaeno, and Alcyone, along with their parents Atlas and Pleione. As daughters of Atlas, the Hyades were sisters of the Pleiades. The following table gives details of the brightest stars in the cluster:

Age and future evolution

Ages for star clusters can be estimated by comparing the Hertzsprung–Russell diagram for the cluster with theoretical models of stellar evolution. Using this technique, ages for the Pleiades of between 75 and 150 million years have been estimated. The wide spread in estimated ages is a result of uncertainties in stellar evolution models, which include factors such as convective overshoot, in which a convective zone within a star penetrates an otherwise non-convective zone, resulting in higher apparent ages.

Another way of estimating the age of the cluster is by looking at the lowest-mass objects. In normal main-sequence stars, lithium is rapidly destroyed in nuclear fusion reactions. Brown dwarfs can retain their lithium, however. Due to lithium's very low ignition temperature of 2.5 × 106 K, the highest-mass brown dwarfs will burn it eventually, and so determining the highest mass of brown dwarfs still containing lithium in the cluster can give an idea of its age. Applying this technique to the Pleiades gives an age of about 115 million years.

The cluster is slowly moving in the direction of the feet of what is currently the constellation of Orion. Like most open clusters, the Pleiades will not stay gravitationally bound forever. Some component stars will be ejected after close encounters with other stars; others will be stripped by tidal gravitational fields. Calculations suggest that the cluster will take about 250 million years to disperse, with gravitational interactions with giant molecular clouds and the spiral arms of our galaxy also hastening its demise.

Reflection nebulosity

With larger amateur telescopes, the nebulosity around some of the stars can be easily seen; especially when long-exposure photographs are taken. Under ideal observing conditions, some hint of nebulosity around the cluster may even be seen with small telescopes or average binoculars. It is a reflection nebula, caused by dust reflecting the blue light of the hot, young stars.

It was formerly thought that the dust was left over from the formation of the cluster, but at the age of about 100 million years generally accepted for the cluster, almost all the dust originally present would have been dispersed by radiation pressure. Instead, it seems that the cluster is simply passing through a particularly dusty region of the interstellar medium.

Studies show that the dust responsible for the nebulosity is not uniformly distributed, but is concentrated mainly in two layers along the line of sight to the cluster. These layers may have been formed by deceleration due to radiation pressure as the dust has moved towards the stars.

Possible planets
Analyzing deep-infrared images obtained by the Spitzer Space Telescope and Gemini North telescope, astronomers discovered that one of the cluster's stars, HD 23514, which has a mass and luminosity a bit greater than that of the Sun, is surrounded by an extraordinary number of hot dust particles. This could be evidence for planet formation around HD 23514.

Gallery

See also
 
 Stozhary
 Matrikas

References

External links

 
 The Pleiades (M45) At the astro-photography site of T. Yoshida.
 Photos and information on the Pleiades from the University of Calgary
 Information on the Pleiades from SEDS
 Information and images from the Anglo-Australian Observatory
 NightSkyInfo.com: The Pleiades
 Maya Astronomy
 Doppler Imaging: Results first Doppler image of a Pleiades solar-type G dwarf – HII314, Strassmeier & Rice 2001, A&A 377, 264
 Dark Atmospheres Photography (deep nebulosity exposure)
 
 The Pleiades (M45) at Constellation Guide
 Warburg Institute Iconographic Database (medieval and early modern images of the Pleiades)

Astronomical objects known since antiquity
Messier objects
NGC objects
Orion–Cygnus Arm

Taurus (constellation)